The Carrizo flower moth (Schinia carrizoensis) is a moth of the family Noctuidae. It is known from central California.

The wingspan is about 31 mm.

External links
Images

carrizoensis
Moths of North America
Moths described in 2010